Integrin, alpha E (ITGAE) also known as CD103 (cluster of differentiation 103) is an integrin protein that in human is encoded by the ITGAE gene. CD103 binds integrin beta 7 (β7– ITGB7) to form the complete heterodimeric integrin molecule αEβ7, which has no distinct name. The αEβ7 complex is often referred to as "CD103" though this strictly refers only to the αE chain. Note that the β7 subunit can bind with other integrin α chains, such as α4 (CD49d).

Tissue distribution 
CD103 is expressed widely on intraepithelial lymphocyte (IEL) T cells (both αβ T cells and γδ T cells) and on some peripheral regulatory T cells (Tregs). It has also been reported on lamina propria T cells. A subset of dendritic cells in the gut mucosa and mesenteric lymph nodes, known as CD103 dendritic cells, also expresses this marker.

It is useful in identifying hairy cell leukemia which is positive for this marker in contrast to most other hematologic malignancies which are negative for CD103 except for hairy cell leukemia variant, a fraction of splenic marginal zone lymphomas, and enteropathy-associated T cell lymphoma.

Function 
The chief ligand for αEβ7 is E-cadherin, a cellular adhesion molecule (CAM) found on epithelial cells. It is probably important for T cell homing to the intestinal sites and thymocyte contacts with thymic reticuloepithelial cells.

Tregs are important for decreasing the immune response and appear to play a crucial role in the prevention of autoimmune diseases. Tregs are defined as CD4+/CD25+/Foxp3+ cells. Some CD4+/FoxP3− cells also express CD103 and have been attributed regulatory activity. It is unclear whether the presence of CD103 on Treg cells represents a specialized feature for Treg, or Treg differentiation of IEL T cells.

See also 
 Cluster of differentiation
 Tissue-resident memory T cell

References

Further reading

External links
 
ITGAE Info with links in the Cell Migration Gateway